Edward Junge Hickox (April 10, 1878 – January 28, 1966) was an American basketball coach and administrator. Born in Cleveland, Ohio, he coached the basketball team of Springfield College from 1926 to 1941, coached the American International College basketball team from 1944 to 1947, was a chairman of the National Basketball Rules Committee from 1945 to 1948, served on the board of directors of the Basketball Hall of Fame from 1959 to 1966 and was an executive secretary of the Hall of Fame from 1949 to 1963.

Hickox was enshrined in the Naismith Memorial Basketball Hall of Fame as a contributor in 1959.  He died January 28, 1966, at Springfield Hospital in Springfield, Massachusetts.

Head coaching record

College football

College basketball

References

External links
 

1878 births
1966 deaths
American International Yellow Jackets men's basketball coaches
Basketball coaches from Ohio
Colorado College Tigers men's basketball coaches
Lycoming Warriors men's basketball coaches
Naismith Memorial Basketball Hall of Fame inductees
National Collegiate Basketball Hall of Fame inductees
Ohio Wesleyan Battling Bishops football players
Southwestern Oklahoma State Bulldogs football coaches
Springfield Pride athletic directors
Springfield Pride football coaches
Springfield Pride men's basketball coaches
High school basketball coaches in the United States
High school football coaches in Colorado
High school football coaches in Pennsylvania
Sportspeople from Cleveland
Players of American football from Cleveland